Yusuf Atılgan (27 June 1921 – 9 October 1989) was a Turkish novelist and  dramatist, who is best known for his novels Aylak Adam (The Loiterer) and Anayurt Oteli (Motherland Hotel). He is one of the pioneers of the modern Turkish novel.

Atılgan is considered one of the pioneers of the modern Turkish novel. His novels had a psychological style, digging into themes such as loneliness, questioning, meaning of life, and the mindful journey of people.  His novels were influenced by modernism.

Atılgan finished middle school in Manisa, then high school in Balıkesir. He graduated in Turkish language and literature from Istanbul University. He finished his thesis titled Tokatlı Kani: Sanat, şahsiyet ve psikoloji under supervision of Nihat Tarlan. Atılgan then began teaching literature at Maltepe Askeri Lisesi in Akşehir. In 1946, he settled down at a village named Hacırahmanlı near Manisa where he took up writing. His novel Aylak Adam  was published in 1959  which dealt with psychological themes such as loneliness, scope and possibility of love, meaning of life, seeking, and obsession. This was followed in 1973 by Anayurt Oteli, which narrated the life of a hotel doorkeeper(named Zebercet) in an Anatolian town, with deep psychological examinations and touching themes such as sexuality and obsession. It gained further fame with a film based on the novel. In 1976, he began working in Istanbul as an editor and translator. With his wife Serpil he had a son in 1979 named Mehmet.

Atılgan died of a heart attack in 1989 while in the middle of writing a novel titled Canistan.

Bibliography
Novels
 Aylak Adam (1959)
 Anayurt Oteli (1973)
 Canistan (2000)
 Motherland Hotel: Translated from the Turkish by Fred Stark -City Lights Publishers. (2016). 

Short Stories
 Bodur Minareden Öte (1960)
 Çocuk Kitabı: Ekmek Elden Süt Memeden (1981)
 Eylemci (Bütün Öyküleri (1992)

Translations
 Toplumda Sanat (K. Baynes; 1980)

Plays
 Toplumda Sanat (K. Baynes; 1980).

References

External links 
A biography of Yusuf Atılgan
Yusuf Atılgan, Contemporary Turkish Literature

1921 births
1989 deaths
Turkish novelists
People from Manisa
20th-century novelists
Balıkesir Lisesi alumni